Neocollyris gracilis is a species of ground beetle in the genus Neocollyris in the family Carabidae. It was described by Horn in 1894.

References

Gracilis, Neocollyris
Beetles described in 1894